Armand Léon Annet (5 June 1888 – 25 April 1973) was a French colonial governor for various colonies in the French colonial empire.

Biography 
Armand Léon Annet was born in Paris on 1888, in Rue de Babylone.

Annet was Governor of French Somaliland from 1935 to 1937.  He was Lieutenant-Governor of Dahomey from 1938 to 1940.  In 1940, Annet sided with Vichy France after the Fall of France. As the Vichy Governor-General of Madagascar from 1941 to 1942, Annet was involved in the Battle of Madagascar. Starting on 5 May 1942, he defended the island with about 8,000 troops. On 5 November 1942, Annet surrendered his remaining forces near Ihosy, on the south of the island. By continuing to fight for 6 months he had become entitled to a higher pension.

See also 
 List of colonial governors of Dahomey
List of colonial governors of Madagascar

References 

1888 births
1973 deaths
Politicians from Paris
French collaborators with Nazi Germany
French Army generals of World War II
French military leaders
Colonial Governors of French Madagascar